Jeremy Nicolas Hutchinson, Baron Hutchinson of Lullington,  (28 March 1915 – 13 November 2017) was a British barrister. He was the son of St John Hutchinson, KC, and his wife, Mary Barnes, and was descended from the regicide Colonel John Hutchinson of Owthorpe. Standing as a Labour candidate in the 1945 general election, he finally entered Parliament as a life peer in 1978, eventually voting with the Liberal Democrats.

Education
Hutchinson was educated at Stowe School and Magdalen College, Oxford, where he graduated with a Master of Arts in Modern Greats (now called Philosophy, Politics and Economics).

Career
Hutchinson was called to the Bar in the Middle Temple in 1939 and served in the Royal Naval Volunteer Reserve during World War II, surviving the torpedoing of the destroyer HMS Kelly in 1941. He was the Labour Party candidate for the constituency of Westminster Abbey at the 1945 general election; he canvassed 10 Downing Street and when informed that the "tenant" (Prime Minister Winston Churchill) was out of the country, he addressed the staff. He worked on the defence team in the Lady Chatterley trial in 1960 and became a Queen's Counsel in 1961. He was a Bencher, Recorder of Bath and of the Crown Court between 1963 and 1988. He also led the defence of the art thief Kempton Bunton in 1965.

He led the defence of director Michael Bogdanov in 1982 against a charge of gross indecency in the play The Romans in Britain by Howard Brenton.  The private prosecution by Christian morality campaigner Mary Whitehouse was defeated when the chief witness against Bogdanov, Whitehouse's solicitor, Graham Ross-Cornes, revealed under cross-examination that he had been sitting at the back of the theatre when he saw what was claimed to be a penis. The prosecution withdrew after Hutchinson demonstrated that Ross-Cornes could have witnessed the actor's thumb protruding from his fist and the case was ended after the Attorney-General entered a nolle prosequi.

Hutchinson was a member of the Committee on Immigration Appeals and of the Committee on Identification Procedures. Hutchinson was Vice-Chairman of the Arts Council of Great Britain and a Professor of Law at the Royal Academy of Arts. At the Tate Gallery, he was first a trustee and then Chairman. On 16 May 1978, Hutchinson was created a life peer with the title  Baron Hutchinson of Lullington, of Lullington in the County of East Sussex. He later took leave of absence from the House of Lords, and on 3 October 2011; he became one of the first two peers to retire from membership under a newly instituted procedure. Following the death of Edward Short, Baron Glenamara, in May 2012, Hutchinson became the oldest living life peer. Hutchinson was four years older than Lord Carrington, who was the oldest sitting member of the House of Lords.

Personal life
Hutchinson was married first to actress Peggy Ashcroft, between 1940 and 1965, with whom he had two children:

 Hon Eliza Hutchinson (born 1941)  
 Hon Nicholas St John Hutchinson (born 1946) 

He had six grand-children including Emily Loizeau.

He later married June Osborn; she died on 26 September 2006.

In October 2013, Hutchinson appeared as a guest on BBC Radio 4's Desert Island Discs. His musical choices were: "Don't Have any More Missus Moore," by Lily Morris, "Dance of the Miller's Wife" from The Three-Cornered Hat by de Falla, "Tea for Two" by Teddy Wilson, "Ah Dite alla giovine" by Giuseppe Verdi, "The Rumble" from West Side Story, the Andante from Piano concerto in C major by Mozart, "L'autre bout du Monde" by Emily Loizeau and the Sonata Opus 110 by Beethoven.

Hutchinson lived in Sussex and London. He celebrated his hundredth birthday on 28 March 2015. He died on 13 November 2017, at the age of 102.

References

1915 births
2017 deaths
Alumni of Magdalen College, Oxford
English barristers
English centenarians
English King's Counsel
Labour Party (UK) parliamentary candidates
Hutchinson of Lullington 
Members of the Middle Temple
Men centenarians
People educated at Stowe School
20th-century King's Counsel
Royal Naval Volunteer Reserve personnel of World War II
20th-century English lawyers
Life peers created by Elizabeth II